Rodrigo Orlando Cabrera Cuéllar (14 March 1938 – 14 June 2022) was a  Salvadoran Roman Catholic prelate.

Cabrera Cuéllar was born in El Salvador and was ordained to the priesthood in 1962. He served as bishop of the Roman Catholic Diocese of Santiago de Maria, El Salvador, from 1985 to his retirement in 2016.

References

1938 births
2022 deaths
20th-century Roman Catholic bishops in El Salvador
Roman Catholic bishops of Santiago de María
Bishops appointed by Pope John Paul II
People from La Libertad Department (El Salvador)